The Braddock expedition, also called Braddock's campaign or (more commonly) Braddock's Defeat, was a British military expedition which attempted to capture Fort Duquesne (established in 1754, located in what is now downtown Pittsburgh) from the French in the summer of 1755, during the French and Indian War of 1754 to 1763. The British troops suffered defeat at the Battle of the Monongahela on July 9, 1755, and the survivors retreated. The expedition takes its name from General Edward Braddock (1695–1755), who led the British forces and died in the effort. Braddock's defeat was a major setback for the British in the early stages of the war with France; John Mack Faragher characterises it as one of the most disastrous defeats for the British in the 18th century.

Background
Braddock's expedition was part of a massive British offensive against the French in North America that summer. As commander-in-chief of the British Army in America, General Braddock led the main thrust against the Ohio Country with a column some 2,100 strong. His command consisted of two regular line regiments, the 44th and 48th, in all 1,400 regular soldiers and 700 provincial troops from several British American colonies, and artillery and other support troops. With these men, Braddock expected to seize Fort Duquesne easily, and then push on to capture a series of French forts, eventually reaching Fort Niagara. George Washington, promoted to Lieutenant-Colonel of the Virginia Regiment on June 4, 1754 by Governor Robert Dinwiddie, was then just 23, knew the territory and served as a volunteer aide-de-camp to General Braddock. Braddock's Chief of Scouts was Lieutenant John Fraser of the Virginia Regiment. Fraser owned land at Turtle Creek, had been at Fort Necessity, and had served as Second-in-Command at Fort Prince George (renamed Fort Duquesne by the French), at the confluence of the Allegheny and Monongahela Rivers.

Braddock mostly failed in his attempts to recruit Native American allies from those tribes not yet allied with the French; he had but eight Mingo Indians with him, serving as scouts. A number of Indians in the area, notably Delaware leader Shingas, remained neutral. Caught between two powerful European empires at war, the local Indians could not afford to be on the side of the loser. They would decide based on Braddock's success or failure.

Braddock's Road

Braddock had received important assistance from Benjamin Franklin, who helped procure wagons and supplies for the expedition. Among the wagoners were two young men who would later become legends of American history: Daniel Boone and Daniel Morgan. Other members of the expedition included Ensign William Crawford and Charles Scott. Among the British were Thomas Gage; Charles Lee, future American president George Washington, and Horatio Gates.

The expedition progressed slowly because Braddock considered making a road to Fort Duquesne a priority in order to effectively supply the position he expected to capture and hold at the Forks of the Ohio, and because of a shortage of healthy draft animals.  In some cases, the column was only able to progress at a rate of two miles (about 3 km) a day, creating Braddock's Road—an important legacy of the march—as they went. To speed up movement, Braddock split his men into a "flying column" of about 1,300 men which he commanded, and, lagging far behind, a supply column of 800 men with most of the baggage, commanded by Colonel Thomas Dunbar. They passed the ruins of Fort Necessity along the way, where the French and Canadians had defeated Washington the previous summer. Small French and Indian war bands skirmished with Braddock's men during the march.

Meanwhile, at Fort Duquesne, the French garrison consisted of only about 250 French marines and Canadian militia, with about 640 Indian allies camped outside the fort. The Indians were from a variety of tribes long associated with the French, including Ottawas, Ojibwas, and Potawatomis. Claude-Pierre Pécaudy de Contrecœur, the Canadian commander, received reports from Indian scouting parties that the British were on their way to besiege the fort. He realised he could not withstand Braddock's cannon, and decided to launch a preemptive strike, an ambush of Braddock's army as he crossed the Monongahela River. The Indian allies were initially reluctant to attack such a large British force, but the French field commander Daniel Liénard de Beaujeu, who dressed himself in full war regalia complete with war paint, convinced them to follow his lead.

Battle of the Monongahela 

By July 8, 1755, the Braddock force was on the land owned by the Chief Scout, Lieutenant John Fraser.  That evening, the Indians sent a delegation to the British to request a conference.  Braddock sent Washington and Fraser.  The Indians asked the British to halt their advance so that they could attempt to negotiate a peaceful withdrawal by the French from Fort Duquesne.  Both Washington and Fraser recommended this to Braddock but he demurred.

The advance guard of 300 grenadiers and colonials with two cannon under Lieutenant Colonel Thomas Gage began to move ahead. George Washington tried to warn him of the flaws in his plan—for example, the French and the Indians fought differently than the open-field style used by the British—but his efforts were ignored: Braddock insisted on fighting as "gentlemen". Then, unexpectedly, Gage's advance guard came upon the French and Indians, who were hurrying to the river, behind schedule and too late to set an ambush.

In the skirmish that followed between Gage's soldiers and the French, the French commander, Beaujeu, was killed by the first volley of musket fire by the grenadiers. Although some 100 French Canadians fled back to the fort and the noise of the cannon held the Indians off, Beaujeu's death did not have a negative effect on French morale; Jean-Daniel Dumas, a French officer, rallied the rest of the French and their Indian allies. The battle, known as the Battle of the Monongahela, or the Battle of the Wilderness, or just Braddock's Defeat, was officially begun. Braddock's force was approximately 1,400 men. The British faced a French and Indian force estimated to number between 300 and 900. The battle, frequently described as an ambush, was actually a meeting engagement, where two forces clash at an unexpected time and place. The quick and effective response of the French and Indians—despite the early loss of their commander—led many of Braddock's men to believe they had been ambushed. However, French documents reveal that the French and Indian force was too late to prepare an ambush, and had been just as surprised as the British.

After an exchange of fire, Gage's advance group fell back. In the narrow confines of the road, they collided with the main body of Braddock's force, which had advanced rapidly when the shots were heard. The entire column dissolved in disorder as the Canadian militiamen and Indians enveloped them and continued to snipe at the British flanks from the woods on the sides of the road. At this time, the French marines began advancing from the road and began to push the British back.

Following Braddock's example, the officers kept trying to reform units into regular show order within the confines of the road, mostly in vain and simply providing targets for their concealed enemy.  Cannon were used, but in such confines of the forest road, they were ineffective. The provincial troops accompanying the British  took cover and returned fire. In the confusion, some of the provincial soldiers who were fighting from the woods were mistaken for the enemy and fired upon by the British regulars.

After several hours of intense combat, Braddock was shot off his horse, and effective resistance collapsed. Colonel Washington, although he had no official position in the chain of command, was able to impose and maintain some order and formed a rear guard, which allowed the remnants of the force to disengage. This earned him the sobriquet Hero of the Monongahela, by which he was toasted, and established his fame for some time to come.

By sunset, the surviving British and colonial forces were fleeing back down the road they had built. Braddock died of his wounds during the long retreat, on July 13, and is buried within the Fort Necessity parklands.

Of the approximately 1,300 men Braddock had led into battle, 456 were killed and 422 wounded. Commissioned officers were prime targets and suffered greatly: out of 86 officers, 26 were killed and 37 wounded. Of the 50 or so women that accompanied the British column as maids and cooks, only 4 survived. The French and Canadians reported 8 killed and 4 wounded; their Indian allies lost 15 killed and 12 wounded.

Colonel Dunbar, with the reserves and rear supply units, took command when the survivors reached his position. He ordered the destruction of supplies and cannon before withdrawing, burning about 150 wagons on the spot. Ironically, at this point the defeated, demoralized and disorganised British forces still outnumbered their opponents. The French and Indians did not pursue and were engaged with looting and scalping. The French commander Dumas realized the British were utterly defeated, but he did not have enough of a force to continue organized pursuit.

Strength of the expedition
According to returns given June 8, 1755, at the encampment at Will's Creek.

His Majesty's Troops

Royal Regiment of Artillery
Detachement under Capt. Robert Hind

Virginia, Maryland and North Carolina Troops

See also 

 Braddock's Battlefield History Center

References

Further reading
 Chartrand, Rene. Monongahela, 1754-1755: Washington's Defeat, Braddock's Disaster. United Kingdom: Osprey Publishing, 2004. .
 Jennings, Francis. Empire of Fortune: Crowns, Colonies, and Tribes in the Seven Years War in America. New York: Norton, 1988. .
 Kopperman, Paul E. Braddock at the Monongahela. Pittsburgh, PA: University of Pittsburgh Press, 1973. .
 O'Meara, Walter. Guns at the Forks. Pittsburgh, PA: University of Pittsburgh Press, 1965. .
 Preston, David L. The Battle of the Monongahela and the Road to Revolution (2015)
 Russell, Peter. "Redcoats in the Wilderness: British Officers and Irregular Warfare in Europe and America, 1740 to 1760", The William and Mary Quarterly (1978) 35#4  pp. 629–652 in JSTOR

External links

 Braddock Road Preservation Association
 The French Army 1600–1900

Battles of the French and Indian War
Braddock Expedition
Battles in Pennsylvania
1755 in North America
History of Pittsburgh
Conflicts in 1755